Max Dennison is a professional digital matte painter and illustrator.

After secondary education at Villiers School in Limerick, and then art school, Dennison quickly established a career producing matte paintings and concept work for the international special effects industry.

Dennison achieved critical acclaim through his work on Academy award-winning films such as Peter Jackson's The Lord of the Rings and John Madden's Shakespeare in Love.

In 2003, while supervising the matte painting department at Weta Digital on Lord of the Rings, Dennison was also nominated for the award of "Best Matte Painting in a Motion Picture" by the Visual Effects Society for his work on The Lord of the Rings: The Two Towers.

Having worked on Revenge of the Sith for Industrial Light & Magic in 2004, he is now based in London and most recently completed work on X-Men: The Last Stand, The Da Vinci Code and Bryan Singer's Superman Returns.

Since then, he set up Matte Painting UK in 2007 based in Shepperton Studios where he and his team continue to produce VFX for the international film industries.

References

External links
 Max Dennison's Official Site
 
 Yahoo Filmography for Max Dennison
 Academy Awards nominations 2002 referencing Max Dennison

Living people
Matte painters
British illustrators
People educated at Villiers School
Year of birth missing (living people)